Gypsy of the North is a 1928 silent film drama directed by Scott Pembroke and starring Georgia Hale.  It was produced by Trem Carr Productions and distributed by Rayart.

An incomplete copy is in the Library of Congress.

Cast
Georgia Hale - Alice Culhane
Huntley Gordon - Steve Farrell
Jack Dougherty - Chappie Evans
William Quinn - Baptiste
Hugh Saxon - Davey
Henry Roquemore - Theatre Manager
Erin La Bissoniere - Jane

References

External links
Gypsy of the North at IMDb.com

 lobby poster

1928 films
American silent feature films
American black-and-white films
Films directed by Scott Pembroke
Silent American drama films
1928 drama films
Rayart Pictures films
1920s American films